Ilebo is a territory in Kasai province of the Democratic Republic of the Congo.

Territories of Kasaï Province